Manousos-Konstantinos Voloudakis (16 December 1966 – 8 February 2023) was a Greek politician who was a Member of the Hellenic Parliament. He was elected MP of the regional unit of Chania, Crete with New Democracy in the 2019 Greek legislative election.

Early life and education 
Voloudakis was born on 16 December 1966 in Athens to a family originally from Sfakia, Crete. He had an Economics degree which he received from the National and Kapodistrian University of Athens. After his graduation, he entered the University of Sussex in England where he obtained a postgraduate degree in Political Economy.

Before becoming a politician, he worked in the private sector, successively in the companies RUSVAR HOLDINGS BV, (1993-1996), in Metaxa Distillery SA. (1996-1997) and at ELVAL S.A. (1997-2004), where he served as Deputy General Manager. He also worked as a business consultant, while from October 2015 to June 2019, he worked again in the private sector, assuming the position of CEO of the company International Trade SA, of the Viohalco heavy industry corporation, based in Brussels. He was fluent in English, French, and Spanish.

Political career 
In September 2007 he was elected as an MP for the New Democracy party and represented the regional unit of Chania Crete. In the period of 2005-2006 he was Secretary General of Trade at the Ministry of Development. He was re-elected following double legislative elections of May and June 2012. He was Deputy Minister of Administrative Reform and e-Governance from June 2012 to June 2013.  He was re-elected in the 2019 Greek legislative election.

Personal life and death 
Voloudakis was married to the lawyer Sevi Amanatidou and father of three children. He died after a battle with lung cancer on 8 February 2023, at the age of 56.

References

External links 

  
 

1966 births
2023 deaths
Greek MPs 2019–2023
New Democracy (Greece) politicians
Ministers of National Education and Religious Affairs of Greece
Politicians from Athens
Greek MPs 2007–2009
Greek MPs 2009–2012
Greek MPs 2012 (May)
Greek MPs 2012–2014
Greek MPs 2015 (February–August)
National and Kapodistrian University of Athens alumni
Alumni of the University of Sussex
Academic staff of the National and Kapodistrian University of Athens
Members of the Hellenic Parliament
Greek MPs 2015–2019
21st-century Greek politicians
Government ministers of Greece
Deaths from lung cancer